The Jam, formally known as the Jammer, is a fictional costumed hero, created by writer-artist Bernie Mireault, who originally appeared in Canadian comic books published by Matrix Graphics Series. The Jammer made his first appearance in New Triumph Featuring Northguard #2 (1985).

The Jammer is the alter ego of Gordon "Gordie" Kirby, an otherwise normal guy who found he enjoyed patrolling the rooftops of his home city of Montréal in a homemade superhero costume. The Jammer is not really a superhero. He often finds himself in the right place at the right time, and is compelled to act heroically. Sometimes he is hired to do good deeds. His personal mission is to "dominate the world with peace, love, and free beer". Through the course of his career, he has battled terrorists, a delusional psychiatrist, and even servants of the Devil.

Publication history
The first published stories of the Jam appeared in New Triumph Featuring Northguard from Matrix Graphic Series between 1985 and Summer of 1986. These stories were collected, along with a new unpublished story, by Matrix Graphics Series as The Jam Special #1 in 1987. A second special, The Jam, Urban Adventure: Super Cool, Color-injected, Turbo Adventure from Hell #1, was published in 1988 by Comico, and advertised a series "bi-monthly starting this summer from Matrix".

Slave Labor Graphics published The Jam, Urban Adventure #1–5 between November 1989 and the Summer of 1991. The Jam, Urban Adventure #1 (November 1989) was an expanded version of the new story found in The Jam Special #1 (1987). Tundra Publishing colorized and republished The Jam, Urban Adventure #1–5 between January and May 1992. Dark Horse Comics picked up the title and published issues' #6-8 between October 1993 and February 1995. Finally, Caliber Comics published issues #9–14 between 1995 and 1997, as well as the Jam short story "The Chair" in Negative Burn #25 (1995).

In 1998, Dark Horse Comics published Madman/Jam, a two-issue series featuring Mike Allred's character Madman. Madman/Jam #1–2 and Nexus Meets Madman were collected and reprinted as the Madman Boogaloo! Starring Nexus & The Jam trade paperback from Dark Horse Comics (1999).

Evil Twin Comics published a story called "Team Jam" in Awesome: The Indie Spinner Rack Anthology (2007) featuring the Jammer and other Bernie Mireault characters.

In 2009, CO2 Comics posted an animated version of the second Jam story, first published in New Triumph Featuring Northguard #3 (1985).

In 2011, the graphic novel To Get Her was published by BEM Graphics and documented the continued adventures of Gordon Kirby and Janet Ditko.

In March 2013, Bernie Mireault posted colorized versions of the first Jam story and "The Chair" feature from Negative Burn to his Comic Art of Bernie Mireault blog.

In 2016, EDGE Science Fiction and Fantasy published a short prose story "The Jam: A Secret Bowman" in Tesseracts Nineteen: Superhero Universe.

In 2017, About Comics published a collection of Bernard Edward Mireault's independent work called "XVI Short Stories" which included versions of the first four Jam stories. In 2022, About Comics published The Jam, Urban Adventure: Super Cool, Color-injected, Turbo Adventure from Hell #2 which includes a new comics adaptation of "The Secret Bowman" as well as the colorized version of "The Chair".

Images of the Jammer were featured in Canadian Comics Cavalcade (Artworx, 1986), Amazing Heroes Swimsuit Special #2 (Fantagraphics Books, 1991), the Caliber Comics 1996 Calendar (Caliber Comics, 1995), Overstreet's Fan #7 - Indy Jam Variant (Gemstone Publishing, 1995), Comic Eye (Blind Bat Press, 2007), Modern Masters, Volume Sixteen: Mike Allred (TwoMorrows Publishing, 2008), and Madman 20th Anniversary Monster! (Image Comics, 2012).

The Jammer's creator Bernie Mireault was featured in Demi-Dieux, 40 ans de super-héros dans la bande dessinée québécoise ("Demi-Gods: 40 Years of Superheroes in Québec Comics") published by Jean-Dominique Leduc at Mem9ire (2014). The Jammer appeared, along with other notable characters, on the cover of the book.

Fictional character biography

Major story arcs

Fun with Flarks
While vacationing in Montréal with friends, the Blood King hired Jane Marble to protect him from a small but determined army of terrorists who followed in his wake. Jane contracted the Gordon Kirby to be the king's body double.

Spans The Jam, Urban Adventure #1–5 (1989–91).

Broken Hearts
The Devil took a special interest in Gordon Kirby when he learned Gordie's happiness ratings were "off the chart".

Spans The Jam, Urban Adventure #1–5 (1989–91), #9–10 (1995).

"...Said the Madman."
Jane Marble referred Gordon Kirby to Dr. Andrew Mandigo who was willing to pay the Jammer to talk about his life as a crimefighter.

Spans The Jam, Urban Adventure #6–8 (1993–5).

To Get Her
Gordon Kirby and Janet Ditko had been together for 10 years. Gordie had rediscovered his calling as a comic artist. Janet was frustrated and looking for a change.

To Get Her (2011).

Multi-issue stories

Ask Him About the Kinetic
Gordon Kirby was sent to Philadelphia, Pennsylvania to personally deliver a message to Jane Marble's client Mark Trimble. She offered to tear up Mark's bill if he told Gordie about the Kinetic.

Spans The Jam, Urban Adventure #13–14 (1996–7).

House of Escher
Gordon Kirby met Frank Einstein who had traveled to Montréal to uncover the mystery behind a reoccurring dream.

Spans Madman/Jam #1–2 (1998).

Short stories

What Are You Doing to My Mother?
The Jammer happened upon Jane Marble being mugged in an alleyway at knifepoint. 
Found in New Triumph #2 (1985).

Fight! Fight! Fight!
The Jammer spotted a mother and her child being threatened on an adjacent rooftop by an angry man with a gun.
Found in New Triumph #3 (1985).

I'm Gonna Screw Up Your Float.
Gordon Kirby tried to return bottles to a convenience store when it was robbed at gunpoint. 
Found in New Triumph #4 (1986).

Time to Get Rich
Gordon Kirby called Jane Marble about a job opportunity and overheard an intruder breaking into her office. 
Found in New Triumph #5 (1986).

You're Such a Pig, Roger.
The Jammer happened upon an enraged man dangling another from the roof of a building by a rope.
Found in The Jam Special #1 (1987).

The Price Is High.
Gordon Kirby dreamed he was the Jammer Omniscient, ruler of Hell for Assholes.
Found in The Jam, Urban Adventure: Super Cool, Color-injected, Turbo Adventure from Hell #1 (1988).

Don't Forget the Rent.
Gordon Kirby visited his bank and noticed two suspicious men walking in and another waiting outside behind the wheel of a car.
Found in The Jam, Urban Adventure: Super Cool, Color-injected, Turbo Adventure from Hell #1 (1988).

New Talent Night
Gordon Kirby and Janet Ditko attended the debut of the Balloons at the Blue Angel Bar's New Talent Night.
Found in The Jam, Urban Adventure #2 (1990).

The Mighty Jan
Janet Ditko dreamed she was a superhero attempting to rescue Gordon Kirby (in his Jammer costume) from the clutches of the evil Hell Lord.
Found in The Jam, Urban Adventure #4 (1990).

God's Window
Tony Matootsi was killed in a freak accident. His wife Nina held a religious vigil.
Found in The Jam, Urban Adventure #6 (1993).

The Chair
Gordon Kirby and Janet Ditko scrambled to acquire nice a chair that had been abandoned in an alley across from their apartment building.
Found in Negative Burn #25 (1995).

Story Time at the Blue Angel
Gordon Kirby met his friend Rex at the Blue Angel Bar to talk about an event that had been bothering him.
 
Breakfast
Rex related a disturbing encounter he had with an enraged motorist.

Asphalt
Bob, a businessman from Texas, told a ghost story about a haunted stretch of highway.

Insects!
A bar patron recounts his unnerving experiences with the intrusive insect life of Winnipeg, Manitoba.
Found in The Jam, Urban Adventure #11 (1995).

Megan's Story
Gordon Kirby and Janet Ditko were invited to Studio C by Janet's Aunt Zoe for the opening of Klee Shonin's new show. 
Found in The Jam, Urban Adventure #12 (1996).

Team Jam
Snuuger Dü, Bug-Eyed Monster, Dr. Robot, and No.1 met the Jammer when they got lost following a storyline.
Found in Awesome: The Indie Spinner Rack Anthology (2007).

Comic Jam
Gordon Kirby attended a regular drawing workshop and social hour for cartoonists at La Sala Rosa Restaurant. The attending artists produced a collaborative comic.
Found in To Get Her (2011).

A Secret Bowman
Gordon Kirby witnessed a man being shot with an arrow by a bowman from an adjoining rooftop.
Found as prose in Tesseract Nineteen: Superhero Universe (2016) and adapted as comics in The Jam, Urban Adventure: Super Cool, Color-injected, Turbo Adventure from Hell #2 (2022).

The works of Gordon Kirby

Mayhem in Alphabet Town
"Mayhem in Alphabet Town" was a bedtime story created by Gordon Kirby for his nephew Ronnie. It is a murder mystery wherein the residents of Alphabet Town come together to determine who killed Q.
Found in The Jam, Urban Adventure #9 (1995).

Internal Dialogue
"Internal Dialogue" is a 16-page comic written and illustrated by Gordon Kirby about a man who is held ransom by his mistreated organs.
Found in To Get Her (2011).

Hi-hat
"Hi-hat" is a series of newspaper-style comicstrips written and illustrated by Gordon Kirby that serve as an allegory to his struggles as an artist.
Found in To Get Her (2011).

Asshole
"Asshole" is a 10-panel newspaper-style comicstrip about a clown asking for a handout from a disillusioned good samaritan.  
Found in To Get Her (2011).

Resume summary
 Rescued a woman from muggers
 Rescued a woman and her child from an armed assailant
 Educated a clerk in the practice of bottle deposits and returns
 Prevented the robbery of a convenience store
 Counseled children on the importance of being polite
 Persuaded a man not to kill another in a fit of rage  
 Rescued a woman from being bludgeoned to death in the street
 Aided local police in the apprehension of three bank robbers
 Mentored at-risk youth
 Helped prevent the assassination of a foreign leader
 Counseled a woman in crisis
 Helped free two people being held in against their will in another dimension
 Disabled a man on a psychotic break, leading to his subsequent arrest and eventual rehabilitation
 Assisted police in the identification and eventual apprehension of a domestic terrorist

Income accrued

Powers and abilities
The Jammer is athletic and in good physical shape and regularly leaps between rooftops when patrolling his neighborhood. The Jammer is a capable hand-to-hand combatant, having knocked armed assailants unconscious, subdued a religious fanatic who was assaulting a woman in the street, easily defended himself against two opponents in the back of a police wagon, and performed an impeccable tomoe nage on a man who attacked him with a cane. The Jammer has also displayed a resistance to hypnotic induction.

Equipment

Costume
The Jammer's costume consists of a loose-fitting dark-green hooded jogging suit (from Sears); a white belt; and dirty white cavalier-style gloves and boots. Bits of orange material were added to the hood to form a mask with large square eyeholes; and an inverted orange triangle was sewn onto the chest. The clumsy hand stitching shows plainly. Gordie's sister Nancy made the costume for him as a joke in reference to his early superhero comic habit and his devotion to the original Batman television series.

Futility Belt
The Jammer's "futility belt" is a jury-rigged tool belt that features four small tubes on either side of a rectangular interlocking buckle. From this belt, he has produced a smoke pellet, a business card, a dog whistle, a notepad & pen, and a plastic pet-waste bag.

Footnotes

Source material
 The Grand Comics Database

Comics characters introduced in 1985
Canada in fiction
Comics set in Canada